Freddy Quispel (born 23 October 2000) is a Dutch footballer who plays as a forward for ACV.

Club career
Quispel made his professional debut with FC Emmen in a 2–0 Eredivisie loss to SC Heerenveen on 17 August 2019.

Personal life
Quispel's father, Joost Quispel, was also a footballer who played for FC Emmen.

References

External links
 
 

2000 births
Living people
Dutch footballers
Footballers from Emmen, Netherlands
Association football forwards
Eredivisie players
FC Emmen players
VfB Oldenburg players
Asser Christelijke Voetbalvereniging players